2016 Czech Lion Awards ceremony was held on 4 March 2017. A Prominent Patient has won 12 awards, including Best picture film.

Winners and nominees

Non-statutory Awards
 Best Film Poster
I, Olga Hepnarová – Lukáš Veverka
A Prominent Patient – Rudolf Biermann, Julius Ševčík
The Noonday Witch – Petr Skala
The Teacher – Michal Tilsch
The Wolf from Royal Vineyard Street – Tereza Kučerová, Jakub Suchý
 Film Fans Award
Anthropoid
 Magnesie Award for Best Student Film
Kyjev Moskva – Anna Lyubynetska
3. poločas – Jiří Volek
Benny – Michal Hruška
Černý dort –  Johana Švarcová
Vězení – Damián Vodrášek

References

2016 film awards
Czech Lion Awards ceremonies